Hexis is a relatively stable arrangement or disposition, for example a person's health or knowledge or character. It is an Ancient Greek word, important in the philosophy of Aristotle, and because of this it has become a traditional word of philosophy. It stems from a verb related to possession or "having", and Jacob Klein, for example, translates it as "possession". It is more typically translated in modern texts occasionally as "state" (e.g., H. Rackham), but more often as "disposition".

General description
Joe Sachs translates it as "active condition", in order to make sure that hexis is not confused with passive conditions of the soul, such as feelings and impulses or mere capacities that belong to us by nature. Sachs points to Aristotle's own distinction, explained for example in Categories 8b, which distinguishes the word diathesis, normally uncontroversially translated as disposition. In this passage, diathesis only applies to passive and shallow dispositions that are easy to remove and change, such as being hot or cold, while hexis is reserved for deeper and more active dispositions, such as properly getting to know something in a way that it will not be easily forgotten. Another common example of a human hexis in Aristotle is health (or sometimes , in Greek) and in cases where hexis is discussed in the context of health, it is sometimes translated as "constitution".

Humans
Apart from needing to be relatively stable or permanent, in contexts concerning humans (such as knowledge, health, and good character) hexis is also generally understood to be contrasted from other dispositions, conditions and habits, by being "acquired" by some sort of training or other habituation.

According to Plotinus, virtue is a hexis of the soul that is not primarily related to praxis and habituation; hexis is a quality of being in an active state of possession that intellectualizes the soul in permanent contemplation of the intelligible world (Enn. VI.8.5.3–37).

Other uses also occur, for example it is sometimes translated as "habit", based upon the classical translation from Greek to Latin "habitus", which also comes from a verb indicating having.

The Latin term is also used in English and as a result "habitus" is for example also a term used in sociology.

Aristotle
Being in a truly fixed state, as opposed to being stable, is not implied in the original Aristotelian usage of this word. He uses the example of "health" being a hexis.

So according to Aristotle, a "hexis" is a type of "disposition" (diathesis) which he in turn describes in the same as follows...

And specifically it is the type of disposition "in virtue of which (kath' ho) the thing which is disposed is disposed well or badly, and either independently or in relation to something else".

The wording "in virtue of which" was also described in the same passage...

In Aristotle then, a hexis is an arrangement of parts such that the arrangement might have excellence, being well arranged, or in contrast, might be badly arranged. Also see Aristotle's Categories viii where a hexis ("habit" in the translation of Edghill) is contrasted with a disposition (diathesis) in terms of it being more permanent and less easy to change. The example given is "knowledge" (epistemē).

In perhaps the most important case, Aristotle contrasted hexis with energeia (in the sense of activity or operation) at Nicomachean Ethics I.viii.1098b33 and Eudemian Ethics II.i.1218b. The subject here was eudaimonia, the proper aim of human life, often translated as "happiness" and hexis is contrasted with energeia (ἐνέργεια) in order to show the correctness of a proposed definition of eudaimonia - "activity (ἐνέργεια) in conformity with virtue"

Happiness
Happiness is said to deserve honoring like the divine if it actually achieved, while virtue of character, being only a potential achievement, deserves praise but is lower.

New Testament

...and defined in the Strong's concordance...

References

Bibliography

Concepts in ancient Greek metaphysics
Greek Muses
Philosophy of Aristotle
Theories in ancient Greek philosophy